Perth is a civil parish in Victoria County, New Brunswick, Canada.

For governance purposes it is divided between the village of Perth-Andover, the Indian reserve of Tobique 20, and the local service district of the parish of Perth. The village and LSD are both members of the Western Valley Regional Service Commission (WVRSC).

Origin of name
Sir Archibald Campbell, then Lieutenant Governor of New Brunswick, was born at Glen Lyon, Perthshire, Scotland. Another possible origin is that local Scotch settlers named it for the city of Perth, Scotland.

History
Perth was erected in 1833 in Carleton County from Kent Parish. The parish included all of modern Victoria County east of the Saint John River and south of the Grand Falls.

In 1850 Victoria County was erected from Carleton County; the new county line ran through Perth, removing part of the parish.

In 1853 all of Perth north of the Tobique Indian Reserve was included in the newly erected Grand Falls Parish.

In 1854 the county line was moved to the pre-1850 southern line of Perth.

In 1864 the eastern part of Perth was included in the newly erected Gordon Parish. Three months later the pre-1854 county line was restored.

Boundaries
Perth Parish is bounded:

 on the north by a line running true east from the northwestern corner of the Tobique 20 Indian reserve on the Saint John River;
 on the east by the Royal Road, starting about 14.5 kilometres inland and running southerly or south-southeasterly along a path passing west of Birch Ridge, through Red Rapids, to the Carleton County line north of Chapmanville;
 on the south by the Carleton County line;
 on the west by the Saint John River.

Communities
Communities at least partly within the parish. bold indicates an incorporated municipality or Indian reserve; italics indicate a name no longer in official use

 Beech Glen
 Bon Accord
 Currie
 Gladstone
 Gladwyn
 Hillside (Caldwell Brook)
 Inman
 Kilburn
 Kincardine
  Lower Kintore
 Lower Perth
 Muniac
 Perth-Andover
 Quaker Brook
 Red Rapids
 Rowena
  Tobique 20
 Maliseet
 Tobique Narrows
  Upper Kintore

Bodies of water
Bodies of water at least partly within the parish.

 Pokiok River
  Saint John River
 Tobique River
 Monquart Stream
 Muniac Stream
 Larlee Creek
 Mud Lake

Other notable places
Parks, historic sites, and other noteworthy places at least partly within the parish.
 Blind Gully Brook Protected Natural Area
 Pokiok River Protected Natural Area
 Porcupine Mountain Protected Natural Area
 Tobique Narrows Dam

Demographics
Parish population total does not include Tobique 20 Indian reserve and portion within Perth-Andover

Population
Population trend

Language
Mother tongue  (2016)

See also
List of parishes in New Brunswick

Notes

References

External links
 Village of Perth-Andover

Parishes of Victoria County, New Brunswick
Local service districts of Victoria County, New Brunswick